The year 1842 in architecture involved some significant events.

Buildings and structures

Buildings

 March 28 – The Teatr Skarbkowski in Lviv (Ukraine), designed by Jan Salzmann and Ludwig Pichl, opens.
 October 18 – The Walhalla memorial in Bavaria, designed by Leo von Klenze, is inaugurated.
 Treasury Building (Washington, D.C.), designed by Robert Mills, central and east wings completed,
 Construction of Berry Hill, near Halifax, Virginia starts.
 Iglesia de la Matriz, Valparaíso, Chile, completed.
 Kawaiahaʻo Church, Honolulu, Hawaii, designed by Rev. Hiram Bingham, completed.
 St Mary's Church, Wreay, Cumberland, England, designed by Sara Losh, consecrated.
 Ak Mosque, Tashkent, Uzbekistan, completed.
 Circular church of the Holy Sepulchre, Cambridge, England, restored by Anthony Salvin.
 Cologne Cathedral construction work is recommenced after 400 years by the Central-Dombauverein zu Köln (Central Cathedral Building Society).

Publications
 Andrew Jackson Downing – Cottage Residences

Awards
 Grand Prix de Rome, architecture: Philippe-Auguste Titeux.

Births

 June 12 – Harry Hems, English architectural and ecclesiastical sculptor (died 1916)
 September 17 – Basil Champneys, English architect (died 1935)
 December 12 – Alfred Parland, Russian architect (died 1919)
 December 15 – George Keller, American architect (died 1935)

Deaths
 October 18 – John Harper, English architect (born 1809)

References

Architecture
Years in architecture
19th-century architecture